Zoltán Horváth (born 30 July 1989) is a Hungarian football player who plays for Nemzeti Bajnokság II club Tiszakécske.

Career
On 7 July 2022, Horváth joined Tiszakécske.

Club statistics

References

External links
 Profile 
 
 Zoltán Horváth at ÖFB

1989 births
People from Kisvárda
Sportspeople from Szabolcs-Szatmár-Bereg County
21st-century Hungarian people
Living people
Hungarian footballers
Hungarian expatriate footballers
Association football forwards
Egri FC players
Debreceni VSC players
Cigánd SE players
Győri ETO FC players
Kisvárda FC players
Diósgyőri VTK players
Tiszakécske FC footballers
Nemzeti Bajnokság I players
Nemzeti Bajnokság II players
Austrian Regionalliga players
Hungarian expatriate sportspeople in Austria
Expatriate footballers in Austria